Frederick Wallis may refer to:

 Frederic Wallis (1853–1928), Anglican priest
Frederick A. Wallis (Democrat), 8th director of Ellis Island, from 1920 to 1921
 Frederick Samuel Wallis (1857–1939), trade unionist and politician in South Australia
 Frederick H. Wallis, architect